Stoopid Buddy Stoodios (formerly known as Stoopid Monkey and stylized as Stoop!d Monkey) is an American production company and animation studio, formed by Seth Green, Matthew Senreich, John Harvatine IV, and Eric Towner. It was established in 2011 following the partnership of Stoopid Monkey, which had been founded in 2005, and Buddy Systems Studios. It is one of the producers of the Adult Swim animated television series Robot Chicken and Titan Maximum as well as SuperMansion on the streaming service Crackle and Buddy Thunderstruck on Netflix.

Filmography

Television series

Web series

Specials

Feature films

Other credits

Production logos 
Every episode of Robot Chicken from seasons 1–4 displays one of many still Stoopid Monkey production logos following the credits; each depicts a cartoon monkey performing an obviously foolish or life-threatening activity or the aftermath of suicide as an irritated Seth Green is heard saying, "Stupid monkey." Each Stoopid Monkey card was drawn by artist and actor Adam Talbott.  All of them except for the first part  
of "Book of Corrine" have the name with an exclamation point replacing the "I" in a jumbled white font surrounded by a thick black border, as well as a smaller white border around that, and Talbott's signature somewhere on the logo. On Titan Maximum and early episodes of Robot Chicken'''s fifth season, the logo is the monkey's shining silver head smiling with the shining Stoopid Monkey text below it. On later episodes of Robot Chicken'' from season 5 onward, the logo returned to a similar concept as the first, but the titular monkey was redesigned to be cuter, despite in season 7 a still variant showcasing only the company logo was used.

References

External links 
 

American companies established in 2005
Mass media companies established in 2005
Television production companies of the United States
American animation studios
Adult animation studios
2005 establishments in California
Companies based in Burbank, California